Centrochelys atlantica is an extinct species of tortoise that lived in the Pleistocene. It was first recorded in the volcanic crater on Sal, Cape Verde.  It was initially identified as similar to the extant Testudo calcarata (= Centrochelys sulcata). The species is no longer present anywhere in the Cape Verde islands. It has since been described as a new species, differentiated from C. sulcata by its smaller size and lesser robusticity. It does not seem there is any evidence this species came into contact with humans. Kehlmaier et al. (2021) identified the type material of this species as belonging to a specimen of the red-footed tortoise, making C. atlantica a junior synonym of the latter species and leaving the extinct tortoise known from fossils excavated on the Sal Island in the 1930s without a scientific name.

References 

Testudinidae
Pleistocene turtles
Neogene reptiles of Africa
Fossil taxa described in 1998